Sherrod Baltimore (born October 5, 1992) is a professional Canadian football defensive back for the Ottawa Redblacks of the Canadian Football League (CFL). He played college football for the Maine Black Bears.

Professional career
Baltimore signed with the Ottawa Redblacks on April 5, 2017 after being scouted by the Redblacks' director of player personnel, Jean-Marc Edmé. He played in his first game on July 24, 2017 against the Toronto Argonauts where he recorded five defensive tackles. Over the 2017 season, he played and started in 13 regular season games and made 47 defensive tackles and was the team's nominee for the CFL's Most Outstanding Rookie Award. He also played in the team's East Semi-Final playoff loss to the Saskatchewan Roughriders that year.

To begin the 2018 Ottawa Redblacks season, Baltimore lost his starting position and was placed on the team's practice roster, despite his previous season's success. After sitting out four games, he was activated for the July 20, 2018 game against the BC Lions as a backup. Throughout the season, he was promoted to starter and relegated back again to back up, but overall played in 13 regular season games while starting in six. He recorded 15 defensive tackles and two interceptions, including his first career interception on a pass from the Hamilton Tiger-Cats' Jeremiah Masoli on October 19, 2018. He again recorded an interception in the Redblacks' East Final playoff win against the Tiger-Cats and played in his first Grey Cup championship game. Despite a strong outing by Baltimore with four defensive tackles and another interception, the Redblacks fell to the Calgary Stampeders 27–16 in the 106th Grey Cup. On December 21, 2018, it was announced that Baltimore had signed an extension with the Redblacks.

In 2019, Baltimore made the opening day active roster for the first time and played in a career-high 16 regular season games. He had 29 defensive tackles and one forced fumble, but the team struggled to a 3–15 record and failed to qualify for the playoffs. He did not play in 2020 due to the CFL cancelling their 2020 season. On January 11, 2021, it was announced that Baltimore had signed an extension with the Redblacks through the 2021 season.

Personal life
Baltimore grew up with his mother, Sharisse Baltimore, and six siblings in the Washington, D.C. area.

References

External links
Ottawa Redblacks bio 

1992 births
Living people
American football defensive backs
Canadian football defensive backs
Maine Black Bears football players
Ottawa Redblacks players
Players of American football from Maryland